The Oregon Equal Suffrage Amendment was an amendment to the constitution of the U.S. state of Oregon, establishing women's suffrage, which was passed by ballot initiative in 1912. It had previously been placed on the ballot, initially by referral from the Oregon Legislative Assembly and later by popular initiative, in 1884, 1900, 1906, 1908, and 1910. When the initiative was ratified in 1912, Oregon became the seventh state to extend the right to vote to women.

Ballot measure #2 on the state's 1906 ballot was the "first attempt in American political history to amend the constitution of a state by the direct initiative of the people, and without any intervention by the legislature." The initiative failed, with 36,902 votes in favor and 47,075 against.

Abigail Scott Duniway was a longtime advocate for women's suffrage in Oregon.

References 

Oregon ballot measures
1906 referendums
Initiatives in the United States